Arlott may refer to:

 John Arlott, English cricket commentator.
 Emily Arlott, English cricketer.
 Variant name of Herleva, mother of William the Conqueror.